The Blatnica Valley is a karst valley in the Greater Fatra Range in Slovakia. It is accessible from the village of Blatnica along a dirt road. Most of the valley is densely forested, in places with views at the surrounding limestone and dolomite strata. The best known part of the valley is the rock window at its lower part. Ostrá and Drieňok mountains can be climbed from the valley bottom.

Valleys of Slovakia
Veľká Fatra
Geography of Žilina Region
Karst